Gorytes willcoxi is a species of sand wasp in the family Crabronidae. It is found in North America.

References

Further reading

 Arnett, Ross H. (2000). American Insects: A Handbook of the Insects of America North of Mexico. CRC Press.

Crabronidae
Insects described in 2009
Hymenoptera of North America